Longjumeau is a commune in the southern suburbs of Paris, France.

Inhabitants of Longjumeau are known as Longjumellois.

History

Longjumeau Party School

In 1911, Lenin founded the Longjumeau Party School to provide instruction to selected militants of the Russian Social Democratic Workers Party  who would travel from Russia to attend. There were 18 students, with three each from Moscow and St Petersburg, with the rest coming from across the Russian Empire. Lenin was the principal lecturer delivering 56 lectures on diverse subjects. Other instructors included: Nikolai Semashko, David Riazanov, Charles Rappoport, Inessa Armand, Zdzisław Leder pl, and Anatoli Lunacharsky.

Population

Transport
Longjumeau is served by three stations on Paris RER line C: Longjumeau, Gravigny – Balizy and Chilly Mazarin RER, which are peaceful due to the low transit.

Education
 the six communal preschools (écoles maternelles) had 895 students, and the six communal elementary schools had 1,432 students, making a total of 2,377 students. Schools include:
 Public preschools: Albert Schweitzer, Balizy, Jean Bernose, Maryse Bastié, Charles Perrault, and Albert Gubanski
 Public elementary schools: Albert Schweitzer, Jules Ferry, Hélène Boucher, Antoine de Saint-Exupéry, Georges Guynemer, and Balizy
 Public junior high schools: Collège Louis Pasteur, Collège André Marois, Collège Pablo Picasso
 Public senior high schools/sixth-form colleges: Lycée Jacques-Prévert and Lycée des Métiers Jean-Perrin
 Private schools: Ecole Maternelle les Saules and Ecole Privée Saint-Anne

Personalities
 Nicolas Charles Seringe, was a French physician and botanist born in Longjumeau.
 Marc Lavoine, is a French singer and actor.
 Loïc Loval, footballer 
 Terence Baya, footballer
 Vincent Dufour, is a French former football player who is now a manager.
 Bingourou Kamara, footballer
 Benjamin Mendy, footballer who currently plays for Manchester City.
 Jérémy Ménez, footballer 
 Olivier Ntcham, footballer who currently plays for Swansea City.
 Stéphane Owona, footballer
 Estelle Raffai, athlete
 Ibrahima Tandia (born in Longjumeau in 1993), footballer
 Adrien Planté, is a French rugby union player
 Jamie Ryan, is an Irish bass guitarist in the French metal band Mass Hysteria.
 Nathalie Kosciusko-Morizet, often referred to by her initials NKM, is a French politician.
 Tanguy Ndombele, footballer who currently plays for S.S.C. Napoli on loan from Tottenham Hotspur
 Kenny Elissonde (professional cyclist).

Trivia
Longjumeau is the setting for the opera-comique Le postillon de Lonjumeau by Adolphe Adam where it is presented as an early 19th-century rural community.  The opera was first performed in Paris at the Opéra-Comique on 13 October 1836. Performances followed in London at the St. James Theatre on 13 March 1837, and in New Orleans at the Théâtre d'Orléans on 19 April 1838.

Longjumeau is twinned with Pontypool in South Wales, UK.

See also

Communes of the Essonne department

References

External links

Official website 

Mayors of Essonne Association 

Communes of Essonne